The Paroidea are a superfamily of passerine birds.

Distribution and habitat 
The superfamily Paroidea is widespread throughout the Northern Hemisphere and in tropical Africa; the greatest concentration of biodiversity occurs in China and in Africa.

Taxonomy 
The superfamily Paroidea includes the following families, previously placed in the superfamily Sylvioidea:
 Remizidae Olphe-Galliard, 1891 (11 species)
 Paridae Vigors, 1825 (61 species)
 Stenostiridae Beresford et al., 2005 (9 species)

Bird superfamilies
Passeriformes